Suzanne Blais-Grenier  (March 2, 1936 – June 13, 2017) was a Canadian politician.

Blais-Grenier was elected to the House of Commons of Canada in the 1984 federal election that brought Brian Mulroney to power. She represented the riding of Rosemont, Quebec. She was appointed to the Cabinet as Prime Minister Mulroney's first Minister of the Environment.

She faced mounting criticism from environmentalists following cuts to various programs, her lackluster performance over several months when being targeted by the Opposition in the House of Commons during question period and her spending on foreign travel. Blais-Grenier was demoted in 1985 to the position of Minister of State for Transport.

Following the demotion, Blais-Grenier became increasingly critical of the Mulroney government. At the end of 1985, she resigned from Cabinet to protest the government's refusal to prevent the closure of an oil refinery in Montreal.

On September 20, 1988, she was expelled from the Progressive Conservative caucus for refusing to withdraw allegations of kickbacks involving the Quebec wing of the party. She ran as an independent candidate in the November 1988 general election, but was defeated by Progressive Conservative Benoît Tremblay, and came in fourth place with 2,060 votes.

Electoral record (partial)

External links
 

1936 births
2017 deaths
Progressive Conservative Party of Canada MPs
Members of the House of Commons of Canada from Quebec
Members of the King's Privy Council for Canada
French Quebecers
Women members of the House of Commons of Canada
Women in Quebec politics
Members of the 24th Canadian Ministry
20th-century Canadian women politicians
Women government ministers of Canada